The Democratised Transport Logistics and Allied Workers Union (DETAWU) is a trade union representing workers in the transportation and logistics industries in South Africa.

The union was founded in 2015, as a split from the South African Transport and Allied Workers Union (SATAWU).  It argued that SATAWU lacked internal democracy and was mismanaging its finances.  In 2017, the union was a founding affiliate of the South African Federation of Trade Unions.  By 2018, it had about 10,000 members.

External links

References

Transportation trade unions
Trade unions established in 2015
Trade unions in South Africa